Global Goon is a former British programmer from Lydiate, England who earned a recording contract with Rephlex Records.

Global Goon has also been rumored to have released five acid records under the alias Syntheme on both Planet Mu and WéMè between 2007 and 2009, but this remains unconfirmed and Syntheme is also known as Louise Helena Wood, from Brighton, England.

Music critics have characterized Global Goon's style as ambient music and "easy listening fusion". From Bessemer Cocktail and after, his music took a turn towards acid house rather than the easy listening downtempo.

Discography
Albums

			
EPs and Singles

See also 
List of ambient music artists

References

External links
 Discography at Discogs

English electronic musicians
1967 births
Living people